Honerath is a municipality in the district of Ahrweiler, in Rhineland-Palatinate, Germany.

References 

Populated places in Ahrweiler (district)